Razija Mujanović (born 15 April 1967) is a Bosnian former women's basketball player. She was voted the best female European basketball player three times (1991, 1994 and 1995) by the Italian sports magazine La Gazzetta dello Sport. She was elected to the FIBA Hall of Fame in 2017.

Club career
Mujanović started her career with Jedinstvo Aida in Tuzla, and continued to play in Italy, Spain, Brazil, the United States, Croatia and Hungary. During her club career, she was twelve-time national league champion (in 1988, 1990, 1992 through 1998, 2002, 2003, 2005), and one national cup in 1992. She won EuroLeague four times, in 1989, 1992, 1994, and 1995. During her club career, she was voted best female European basketball player in Euroscar European Player of the Year three times, in 1991, 1994, and 1995.

WNBA career
In 1998, the Detroit Shock recruited Razija Mujanović, who played all 30 games of the season with the team.

National team career
Mujanović won silver medals with the senior Yugoslavia women's national basketball team, at the 1988 Summer Olympic Games, the 1990 FIBA World Cup, and the EuroBasket Women 1991. She later played with the senior Bosnian women's national basketball team. She played her last game with Bosnia, in September 2007.

References

1967 births
Living people
Basketball players at the 1988 Summer Olympics
Bosnia and Herzegovina expatriate basketball people in Spain
Bosnia and Herzegovina expatriate basketball people in the United States
Bosnia and Herzegovina women's basketball players
Centers (basketball)
Competitors at the 1993 Mediterranean Games
Detroit Shock players
Bosnia and Herzegovina expatriate basketball people in Italy
FIBA Hall of Fame inductees
Medalists at the 1988 Summer Olympics
Mediterranean Games gold medalists for Bosnia and Herzegovina
Mediterranean Games medalists in basketball
Olympic basketball players of Yugoslavia
Olympic medalists in basketball
Olympic silver medalists for Yugoslavia
People from Čelić
Yugoslav women's basketball players
ŽKK Jedinstvo Tuzla players
Bosnia and Herzegovina expatriate basketball people in Hungary
Bosnia and Herzegovina expatriate basketball people in Croatia